The Night Riders is a 1916 American silent Western film, featuring Harry Carey.

Cast
 Harry Carey
 Olive Carey credited as Olive Fuller Golden
 Peggy Coudray
 Hoot Gibson
 Neal Hart
 Joe Rickson

See also
 Harry Carey filmography
 Hoot Gibson filmography

External links
 

1916 films
1916 short films
1916 Western (genre) films
American silent short films
American black-and-white films
Films directed by Jacques Jaccard
Silent American Western (genre) films
1910s American films
1910s English-language films